The 1920 William & Mary Indians football team represented the College of William & Mary as a member of the South Atlantic Intercollegiate Athletic Association (SAIAA) during the 1920 college football season. Led by James G. Driver is his second and final season as head coach, the Indians compiled an overall record of 4–5 with a mark of 0–4 in conference play.

Schedule

References

William and Mary
William & Mary Tribe football seasons
William and Mary Indians football